Terry High School may refer to:
 Terry High School, Hinds County School District, Terry, Mississippi
 B.F. Terry High School, Lamar Consolidated Independent School District, Rosenberg, Texas